Goat Getter is a 1925 American silent action film directed by Albert S. Rogell and starring Billy Sullivan, John Sinclair and Kathleen Myers.

Cast
 Billy Sullivan as Billy Morris 
 John Sinclair as Pie-Eye Pickens 
 Kathleen Myers as Virginia Avery 
 Virginia Vance as Mamie Arthur 
 Eddie Diggins as Lightning Bradley 
 William Buckley as Carter Bond 
 Joe Moore as Slug Geever

References

Bibliography
 James Robert Parish & Michael R. Pitts. Film directors: a guide to their American films. Scarecrow Press, 1974.

External links
 

1925 films
1920s action films
1920s English-language films
American silent feature films
American action films
American black-and-white films
Films directed by Albert S. Rogell
Rayart Pictures films
Silent action films
1920s American films